The 1947 All-Big Six Conference football team consists of American football players chosen by various organizations for All-Big Six Conference teams for the 1947 college football season.  The selectors for the 1947 season included the United Press (UP).

All-Big Six selections

Backs
 Bas Enisminger, Missouri (UP-1)
 Ray Evans, Kansas (UP-1)
 Jack Mitchell, Oklahoma (UP-1)
 Forrest Griffith, Kansas (UP-1)

Ends
 Otto Schnellbacher, Kansas (UP-1)
 Mel Sheehan, Missouri (UP-1)

Tackles
 Wade Walker, Oklahoma (UP-1)
 Chester Fritz, Missouri (UP-1)

Guards
 Don Fambrough, Kansas (UP-1)
 Paul Burris, Oklahoma (UP-1)

Centers
 John Rapacz, Oklahoma (UP-1)

Key
UP = United Press

See also
1947 College Football All-America Team

References

All-Big Six Conference football team
All-Big Eight Conference football teams